Executive Order 10925, signed by President John F. Kennedy on March 6, 1961, required government contractors to "take affirmative action to ensure that applicants are employed and that employees are treated during employment without regard to their race, creed, color, or national origin." It established the President's Committee on Equal Employment Opportunity (PCEEO), which was chaired by then Vice President Lyndon Johnson.  Vice Chair and Secretary of Labor Arthur Goldberg was in charge of the Committee's operations. This first implementation of affirmative action was intended to give equal opportunities in the workforce to all U.S. citizens, not to give special treatment to those discriminated against.

Following passage of the Civil Rights Act of 1964 (which went into effect a year later on July 2, 1965) and President Johnson's Executive Order 11246 (which was signed on September 24, 1965), the Committee's functions were divided between the Equal Employment Opportunity Commission (EEOC) and the Office of Federal Contract Compliance (which in 1975 was renamed the Office of Federal Contract Compliance Programs).

Opponents of the PCEEO and Executive Order 10925 included Senator J. Lister Hill, a segregationist Democrat from Alabama, who claimed that the committee and the executive order were overreaches by the federal government into the private business of America.

See also
Executive Order 8802
Affirmative action in the United States
Executive order (United States)

References

External links

Full text of Executive Order 10925 
Text of Executive Order 11246

10925
History of civil rights in the United States
20th-century military history of the United States
1961 in American law
1961 in American politics
History of affirmative action in the United States
Anti-discrimination law in the United States
Employment discrimination
Civil rights movement